Julie Campbell may refer to:

 Julie Campbell Tatham (1908–1999), pen name Julie Campbell, American writer of children's novels
 Julie Campbell (vascular biologist) (born 1946), Australian vascular biologist
 Julie Campbell (musician), music artist from Manchester, England, also known as LoneLady
Julie-Ann Campbell, Australian lawyer and trade unionist, and Secretary of the Queensland branch of the Australian Labor Party

See also
Julia Campbell (disambiguation)
Juliet Campbell (disambiguation)